Danilovsky District is the name of several administrative and municipal districts in Russia. The districts' name generally derives from or is related to the male first name Danil.
Danilovsky District, Moscow, a district in Southern Administrative Okrug of Moscow
Danilovsky District, Volgograd Oblast, an administrative and municipal district of Volgograd Oblast
Danilovsky District, Yaroslavl Oblast, an administrative and municipal district of Yaroslavl Oblast

See also
Danilovsky (disambiguation)

References